Orme is an Unincorporated community  in Prince George's County, Maryland, United States.

A post office served the community from 1893 to 1914.

References

Unincorporated communities in Prince George's County, Maryland
Unincorporated communities in Maryland